James Calvin White (born February 3, 1992) is an American former football player who was a running back in the National Football League (NFL) for eight seasons with the New England Patriots. He played college football for the Wisconsin Badgers and was selected by the Patriots in the fourth round of the 2014 NFL Draft. He was primarily used as a receiver and won three championships with the Patriots. In Super Bowl LI, he set records for most receptions and most points scored in a Super Bowl.

High school career
White attended the St. Thomas Aquinas High School in Fort Lauderdale, Florida. While there, he played high school football for the Raiders. He was a part of the 2008 St. Thomas Aquinas National Championship team. At Aquinas, he primarily split time with Giovani Bernard, who is currently a running back for the Tampa Bay Buccaneers. He rushed for over 1,000 yards and over 20 touchdowns in his senior year and was chosen to the (Broward) All-County team. White also played and lettered in baseball.

White came out of St. Thomas Aquinas as the 70th-ranked running back in his class, and as a three star recruit by Scout.com. He chose Wisconsin over Clemson, Michigan State, and South Florida, among others. He was given the nickname "Sweet Feet".

College career

White attended the University of Wisconsin–Madison from 2010 to 2013. He was named the 2010 Big Ten Freshman of the Year. White rushed for 1,052 yards and 14 touchdowns, leading the Badgers to the 2011 Rose Bowl in Pasadena, California. In the 2011 season, he had 713 rushing yards and six rushing touchdowns to go along with 15 receptions for 150 yards. In the 2012 season, he finished with 806 rushing yards, 12 rushing touchdowns, eight receptions, 132 receiving yards, and one receiving touchdown. On November 16, 2013, White ran for a career-high 205 yards against Indiana. Also, during that game, White set a Wisconsin record for longest run from scrimmage (93 yards). In the 2013 season, he finished with 1,444 rushing yards, 13 rushing touchdowns, 39 receptions, 300 receiving yards, and two receiving touchdowns. White rushed for over 100 yards a game on 17 different occasions during his college career, despite splitting carries with John Clay, Montee Ball, and Melvin Gordon for most of his career.

College statistics

Professional career

2014 season: Rookie year
White was drafted by the New England Patriots in the fourth round (130th overall) of the 2014 NFL Draft. He was active for only three games for the Patriots. In Week 4, against the Kansas City Chiefs, he made his NFL debut. In the 41–14 loss, he had three carries for 21 yards and three receptions for 15 yards. He was inactive for the team's 28–24 win over the Seattle Seahawks in Super Bowl XLIX.

2015 season
White emerged onto the national scene during Week 11 with a two-touchdown performance (one rushing, one receiving) in a 20–13 victory over the Buffalo Bills on Monday Night Football after starting running back Dion Lewis was out for the season with a torn ACL. He finished the game with 14 rushing yards and 32 receiving yards. The win pushed the Patriots' record to 10–0 for the season. In Week 13, White caught a career-high 10 passes for 115 yards and a touchdown in the Patriots' 35–28 loss to the Philadelphia Eagles. Overall, White finished the 2015 season with 40 receptions for 410 receiving yards and four touchdowns to go along with 22 carries for 56 rushing yards and two rushing touchdowns.

2016 season
White had a breakout season as the Patriots primary passing back with Lewis starting the season on the PUP list. In Week 5, which was Brady's return from suspension from Deflategate, White caught four passes for 63 yards in a 33–13 victory over the Cleveland Browns. In a 35–17 Week 6 victory against the Cincinnati Bengals, White caught two touchdown passes from Tom Brady, a 15-yard and a six-yard while recording a team-high eight receptions for 47 yards and rushing seven times for 19 yards. In the Week 7 game against the Pittsburgh Steelers White caught his third touchdown pass of the season. In Week 11, against the San Francisco 49ers, White caught six passes for 63 yards and recorded his fourth touchdown of the season. During Week 14 game against the Baltimore Ravens, White caught three passes for 81 yards, including a 61-yard catch and run from Tom Brady. During Week 16 against the New York Jets, White caught three passes for 32 yards and a touchdown, making it his fifth receiving touchdown of the season. With his Week 16 performance, White became one of four running backs to have 500 or more receiving yards in the 2016 season. Overall, he finished the 2016 season with 60 receptions for 551 receiving yards and five receiving touchdowns to go along with 39 carries for 166 rushing yards.

Super Bowl LI
During Super Bowl LI against the Atlanta Falcons, White had 139 yards from scrimmage (29 rushing, 110 receiving). He joined Roger Craig as the only running back with more than 100 receiving yards in a Super Bowl and broke Denver Broncos wide receiver Demaryius Thomas's previous record for most receptions in a Super Bowl, which came in a 43–8 loss to the Seattle Seahawks in Super Bowl XLVIII, with 14. He scored three touchdowns and a two-point conversion, setting a record for points in a Super Bowl, with 20; that record was tied for the first time in Super Bowl LVII by Jalen Hurts.

All of White's 20 points in Super Bowl XLVIII came after the Patriots trailed 28–3 midway through the third quarter. Danny Amendola's two-point conversion following White's second touchdown tied the game at 28, sending the Super Bowl to overtime for the first time ever. During overtime, White delivered the game-winning play by rushing two yards into the end zone for a touchdown as the Patriots won 34–28, becoming the first team in 134 tries to win when trailing by more than 17 points after 3 quarters in a postseason game (the Patriots trailed by 19).

Brady, who won the Super Bowl MVP award, said that he believed White should have won the award instead. To show his thanks, Brady gave White his MVP prize, a pick up truck, which White accepted. Several commentators, as well as Pittsburgh Steelers running back Le'Veon Bell, also believed White should have won the award.

While White is the only player to score in overtime in a Super Bowl, he is the second player to score the winning touchdown in overtime in an NFL championship game after Alan Ameche, a fellow Wisconsin Badger, who did so for the Baltimore Colts in 1958.

2017 season
On April 18, 2017, White, who was entering the final year of his rookie contract, signed a three-year, $12 million extension through the 2020 season. The contract included $4.69 million in guarantees and an additional $3 million in incentives. White finished the 2017 season with 43 carries for 171 yards along with 56 receptions for 429 yards and three touchdowns. The Patriots finished the season with 13 wins and earned the #1-seed for the AFC Playoffs. In the Divisional Round against the Tennessee Titans, White recorded a rushing touchdown and receiving touchdown. He finished with 11 rushing yards and 29 receiving yards. In the AFC Championship Game, White recorded the Patriots' first touchdown of the game and the team would go on to win 24–20 and advance to the Super Bowl. He finished the game with four rushing yards and 22 receiving yards. In Super Bowl LII, White had seven carries for 45 yards and scored the Patriots' first touchdown of the game and also caught two passes for 21 yards, but the Patriots lost 41–33 to the Philadelphia Eagles.

2018 season
In 2018, White was named a team captain for the first time in his career. In the season opener against the Houston Texans, White rushed five times for 18 yards and caught four passes for 38 yards and a touchdown as the Patriots won by a score of 27–20. In Week 4, against the Miami Dolphins, he rushed for 68 yards and a touchdown while also catching eight receptions for 44 yards and a touchdown in the 38–7 victory. In Week 5, he tied his career-high with 10 receptions for 77 yards and a touchdown in a 38–24 victory over the Indianapolis Colts. Two weeks later in a 38–31 road victory against the Chicago Bears, White rushed for 40 yards and caught eight passes for 57 yards and two touchdowns. During Week 9 against the Green Bay Packers, White finished with 31 rushing yards on 12 carries for two touchdowns and caught six passes for 72 yards. After a Week 11 bye, White rushed for a career-high 73 yards in a 27–13 road victory against the New York Jets.

White finished the regular season setting career-highs in rushing yards with 425, rushing touchdowns with five, receptions with 87, receiving yards with 751, and receiving touchdowns with seven.

In the AFC Divisional Round against the Los Angeles Chargers, White tied the all-time single-game playoff receptions record with 15. He finished the game with 97 receiving yards. In the AFC Championship Game, the Patriots went on the road to face the Kansas City Chiefs. In that game, White had six carries for 23 yards and four receptions for 49 yards, including a 30-yard reception, his team's longest of the game, as the Patriots defeated the Chiefs 37–31 in overtime to reach Super Bowl LIII. During the Super Bowl, which was played on White's 27th birthday, rookie Sony Michel took over most of the rushing duties, leaving White in a limited role as the Patriots defeated the Los Angeles Rams by a score of 13–3. He finished the Super Bowl with four rushing yards and five receiving yards.

2019 season
White scored his first touchdown of the season on a 10-yard pass as the Patriots defeated the Miami Dolphins on the road by a score of 43–0. During Week 9 against the Baltimore Ravens, he earned his first start of the season and rushed for 38 yards and his first rushing touchdown of the year along with catching two passes for 46 yards in the 37–20 road loss. During Week 13 against the Houston Texans on Sunday Night Football, White rushed 14 times for 79 yards including a career-long 32-yard rush and caught eight passes for 98 yards and two touchdowns in the 28–22 road loss. Overall, White finished the 2019 season with 263 rushing yards and one rushing touchdown to go along with 72 receptions for 645 receiving yards and five receiving touchdowns.

2020 season
A few hours prior to the Patriots' Week 2 game against the Seattle Seahawks on Sunday Night Football, White's father was killed in a car crash and his mother was left in critical condition.  He was listed as an inactive player for the game.  During the game, teammate Devin McCourty ran up to the camera and yelled "28, we love you bro!" after he recorded a pick six. In Week 12, White scored two rushing touchdowns in the 20–17 victory over the Arizona Cardinals. He finished the 2020 season with 35 carries for 121 rushing yards and two rushing touchdowns to go along with 49 receptions for 375 receiving yards and one receiving touchdown.

2021 season
On March 25, 2021, White re-signed with the Patriots on a one-year, $2.5 million contract. He suffered a hip injury in Week 3 and was placed on injured reserve on October 1, 2021.

Retirement
On March 15, 2022, White signed a two-year, $5 million contract extension with the Patriots. Despite this, he announced his retirement via Twitter on August 11, 2022.

NFL career statistics

Regular season

Postseason

NFL records

 Tied with Darren Sproles for most receptions in a playoff game (15)

Super Bowl records

 Most receptions (14)
 Most receiving yards by a running back (110)
 Most points scored (20), tied with Jalen Hurts
 Most points scored in overtime (6)

Notes

References

External links
 Wisconsin Badgers biography
New England Patriots biography

1992 births
Living people
American football running backs
St. Thomas Aquinas High School (Florida) alumni
Wisconsin Badgers football players
New England Patriots players
Players of American football from Fort Lauderdale, Florida
Ed Block Courage Award recipients